4959 Niinoama is a dark background asteroid from the outer regions of the asteroid belt. It was discovered by Japanese astronomers Akira Natori and Takeshi Urata at JCPM Yakiimo Station on 15 August 1991. It was named after Taira no Tokiko (1126–1185) of the Imperial House of Japan during the Heian period.

Orbit and classification 

Niinoama is a non-family asteroid of the main belt's background population when applying the hierarchical clustering method to its proper orbital elements. It orbits the Sun in the outer main-belt at a distance of 3.1–3.2 AU once every 5 years and 7 months (2,044 days). Its orbit has an eccentricity of 0.01 and an inclination of 9° with respect to the ecliptic. A first precovery was taken at Palomar Observatory in May 1950, extending the body's observation arc by more than 41 years prior to its official discovery observation at Yakiimo.

Naming 

This minor planet was named after Taira no Tokiko (1126–1185), second wife of military leader Taira no Kiyomori and grandmother of Emperor Antoku after whom  is named. According to the Tale of the Heike, she drowned herself during the Battle of Dan-no-ura together with the boy-Emperor Antoku in her arms. The  was published by the Minor Planet Center on 10 November 1992.

Physical characteristics 

Niinoama is an assumed C-type asteroid.

Photometry 

Photometric observations of Niinoama collected during 2008 show a rotation period of  hours with a brightness variation of 0.32 ± 0.04 magnitude, superseding an early measurement that gave  hours.

Diameter and albedo 

According to the surveys carried out by the Infrared Astronomical Satellite IRAS, the Japanese Akari satellite, and NASA's Wide-field Infrared Survey Explorer with its subsequent NEOWISE mission, Niinoama measures between 26.50 and 42.51 kilometers in diameter and its surface has an albedo of 0.079. The Collaborative Asteroid Lightcurve Link adopts a diameter of 27.96 kilometers from IRAS, and derives an albedo of 0.1082 based on an absolute magnitude of 10.8.

References

External links 
 Lightcurve Database Query (LCDB), at www.minorplanet.info
 Dictionary of Minor Planet Names, Google books
 Asteroids and comets rotation curves, CdR – Geneva Observatory, Raoul Behrend
 Discovery Circumstances: Numbered Minor Planets (1)-(5000) – Minor Planet Center
Here is a shot of asteroid Niinoama, 2.2au from Earth on 17JAN2005 from the SDSS site - Fermats Brother
 
 

004959
Discoveries by Akira Natori
Discoveries by Takeshi Urata
Named minor planets
19910815